Anar Isgandarov Azerbaijani historian, Doctor of historical sciences, professor and Chief of the department of "Source Study, Historiography and Methods" of Baku State University., Deputy of the Milli Mejlis of Azerbaijan of the VI convocation (from 2020).

Early life 
Anar Isgandarov was born in the Kolatan village of the Masalli region in 1956. From 1973 to 1978, he studied at and graduated with honors from the Department of History, Baku State University.

Career 
From 1978 to 1981 he worked as a history teacher in the Masalli district, Azerbaijan. From 1982 to 1984 he worked as the Head of the Cabinet at the Department of Philosophy of the Azerbaijan State Oil Academy. From 1984 to 1999 he worked at BSU in the Department of Source Studies, Historiography and Methods as a senior laboratory assistant, teacher, senior teacher and assistant professor. Beginning in1999 he began serving as head of the department.

He lectures and conducts seminars in: “Historiography of the history of Azerbaijan”; "Sources of the history of Azerbaijan"; “Actual problems of historical science”; "Methodological problems of historical research."

In 1989 he defended his thesis on the topic: “Historiography, the establishment and strengthening of Soviet power in Azerbaijan".

In 2004 he defended his doctoral dissertation on the topic: “Historiography of the problem of the genocide of the Turks in Azerbaijan 1917-1918.”

On January 11, 2016, by Decree of the President of the Republic of Azerbaijan, he was awarded the Order for Service to the Fatherland, III degree, for service to the Democratic Republic of Azerbaijan.

Selected works 
Historiography of March genocide 1918. Baki, 1997
Azerbaijan People Republic. Baki, 2003
Azerbaijan People Republic. (bibliography). Baki, 2003
Historiography of the problem of Turkish-Muslim genocide in Azerbaijan in 1918–1920. Baki, 2006
The Caucasian İslamic Army and The Salvation of Azerbaijan, Bakı, Turxan NPB publisher, 2019, p. 120

Awards 
 Honorary Diploma of President (Azerbaijan)
 Taraggi Medal
 For service to the Fatherland Order
 Azerbaijan Democratic Republic 100th anniversary medal
 Baku State University 100th anniversary medal

References

20th-century Azerbaijani historians
1956 births
Living people
Recipients of the Azerbaijan Democratic Republic 100th anniversary medal
21st-century Azerbaijani historians